David Patrick Hannan (born November 26, 1961) is a Canadian former professional hockey left winger who played 16 seasons in the National Hockey League with the Pittsburgh Penguins, Edmonton Oilers, Toronto Maple Leafs, Buffalo Sabres, Colorado Avalanche and Ottawa Senators. He is a two-time winner of the Stanley Cup, with Edmonton in 1988 and with Colorado in 1996.

Playing career
Hannan's junior hockey career was divided between the Windsor Spitfires, Sault Ste. Marie Greyhounds, and Brantford Alexanders. He was drafted in the 10th round (196th overall) of the 1981 NHL Entry Draft by the Pittsburgh Penguins. His best statistical season in the NHL was 1985–86, in which he recorded 35 points in 75 games with the Pittsburgh Penguins. He is perhaps best remembered for a goal he scored while a member of the Buffalo Sabres. On April 27, 1994, during the fourth overtime of a scoreless Game 6 of a playoff series at the Buffalo Memorial Auditorium, he backhanded a shot past New Jersey's Martin Brodeur to force Game 7 in New Jersey. Hannan's final NHL season was 1996–97, in which he played 34 games with the Ottawa Senators before retiring.

Career statistics

Regular season and playoffs

International

Awards and honors

References

External links
 

1961 births
Living people
Baltimore Skipjacks players
Brantford Alexanders players
Buffalo Sabres players
Canadian ice hockey left wingers
Canadian people of British descent
Colorado Avalanche players
Edmonton Oilers players
Erie Blades players
Ice hockey people from Ontario
Sportspeople from Greater Sudbury
Ice hockey players at the 1992 Winter Olympics
Medalists at the 1992 Winter Olympics
Olympic ice hockey players of Canada
Olympic medalists in ice hockey
Olympic silver medalists for Canada
Ottawa Senators players
Pittsburgh Penguins draft picks
Pittsburgh Penguins players
Sault Ste. Marie Greyhounds players
Stanley Cup champions
Toronto Maple Leafs players
Windsor Spitfires players